Darian may refer to:

People

Surname
Anita Darian (1927–2015), American singer
Yeghishe Darian, Lebanese footballer

Given name
Darian Barnes (born 1980), American football player
Darrian Beavers (born 1999), American football player
Darian Cowgill (born 1972), American audio engineer
Darian DeVries (born 1975), American basketball coach
Darian Durant (born 1982), American football player
Darian Forbes (born 1984), Turks and Caicos Islands sprinter
Darian Grubb (born 1975), American NASCAR mechanic and racing crew chief
Darian Hagan (born 1970), American football player
Darian Jenkins (born 1995), female American soccer player
Darian King (born 1992), Barbadian tennis player
Darian Kinnard (born 1999), American football player
Darian Lane, American music video director
Darian Leader (born 1965), British psychoanalyst
Darian Sahanaja, Indonesian musician
Darian Stevens (born 1996), female American Olympic freestyle skier
Darian Stewart (born 1988), American football player
Darian Thompson (born 1993), American football player
Darian Townsend (born 1984), South African swimmer

Characters
Darian Firkin, a fictional character in several novels by Mercedes Lackey
Darian Hallenbeck, a child character in the film The Last Boy Scout

Places
Darian, Iran, a city in Fars Province, Iran
Darian, Kermanshah, a village in Kermanshah Province, Iran
Daryan, East Azerbaijan, a village in East Azerbaijan Province, Iran
Darian Rural District, in Fars Province, Iran

Other uses
Darian calendar, a proposed system of timekeeping for the planet Mars

See also
Darien (disambiguation)
Darion (disambiguation)
Dıryan, Lankaran Rayon, Azerbaijan

English-language unisex given names